Stenoptilia graphodactyla is a moth of the family Pterophoridae. It is found in Spain, Belgium, Germany, Poland, the Czech Republic, Slovakia, Austria, Switzerland, Italy, Romania, Bulgaria, Serbia and Montenegro, North Macedonia and Albania. It is also known from Russia (the West Siberian plain).

The wingspan is 22–27 mm. Adults are on wing in July.

The larvae feed on Gentiana species, including Gentiana lutea, Gentiana verna, Gentiana clusii, Gentiana asclepiadea and Gentiana pneumonanthe.

References

External links
Lepiforum e.V.

graphodactyla
Moths described in 1833
Moths of Asia
Plume moths of Europe
Taxa named by Georg Friedrich Treitschke